The third season of Shameless, an American comedy-drama television series based on the British series of the same name by Paul Abbott, premiered on January 13, 2013, at Sunday 9:00 p.m. EST on the Showtime television network. Executive producers are John Wells, Paul Abbott and Andrew Stearn, with producer Michael Hissrich. The season concluded after 12 episodes on April 7, 2013. The show's season premiere brought in 2.00 million viewers, becoming the show's highest-rated episode ever to-date. The episode airing February 17, "The Sins of My Caretaker", received 1.31 million total viewers, its lowest-rated episode of the season. The season finale scored 1.82 million viewers.

Plot
Fiona struggles to adapt to life with Jimmy, as he officially moves in with the Gallaghers. Jimmy, however, has more pressing concerns when Estefania's drug lord father, Nando, returns to the United States. Nando kills Marco and forces Jimmy to dismember the body; he also tells Jimmy that he wants him to stay married to Estefania, so Estefania can become an American citizen. Out of fear for his life, Jimmy agrees, but he keeps it a secret from Fiona.

Frank calls Child Protective Services on his own family after being kicked out of his own house once again. When a CPS worker comes for a visitation at a particularly hectic time, the underage kids are forced into separate foster homes, many being less-than-adequate. Though Veronica and Kevin attempt to foster the kids, Fiona ultimately gets Frank to clean up for their foster worker. When Fiona finds out Frank is the one who called CPS, Fiona fights for custody of the children against Frank, and is declared their legal guardian. This is bad news for Jimmy, who had plans to go to medical school in Michigan. Though Fiona, albeit shocked, is initially supportive, she is enraged to find out Jimmy had applied for a studio apartment only. After she and Jimmy get into a nasty argument over their relationship, Fiona breaks up with him.

Ian continues his relationship with Mickey, and their relationship continues to grow in the first half of the season. After the Gallagher children are put into foster homes, Mickey invites Ian to stay with him while his father, Terry, is out of town. However, Terry comes home early and unexpectedly walks in on them having sex. Terry—who is abusive and homophobic—beats the two boys at gunpoint and forces Mickey to have sex with a Russian prostitute, Svetlana; Mickey is thereby damaged and refuses to communicate with Ian. To Ian's dismay, Mickey marries Svetlana, who has become pregnant with his child. Meanwhile, Mandy and Lip are together, though Lip begins feeling smothered by Mandy when she becomes more involved in his life. Worried that Lip will throw away his future, Mandy secretly applies Lip for several colleges, and a successful interview gives Lip a chance at MIT. Lip thanks Mandy for her help. Kevin and Veronica continue their quest to have a baby, but there is little chance of Veronica getting pregnant; Veronica asks her mother to be their surrogate.

Family troubles are not limited to the Gallaghers: Sheila is struggling to deal with parental life, and her problems are further compounded when Jody relapses in his sex addiction. Sheila desperately lets Frank offer his support with Hymie, which leaves him with a temporary home. When Timmy Wong's family want Hymie to live with them, Sheila reluctantly obliges, realizing that her home is an unsuitable environment to raise a baby. Later the next day, Karen returns home. Sheila is overjoyed by Karen's return, but after speaking with Timmy Wong's mother, Sheila discovers that Karen had previously called the Wong family to take Hymie away from her and Jody. Heartbroken by her daughter's actions, Sheila becomes depressed. Meanwhile, Karen briefly rekindles her sexual relationship with Lip, but Lip decides against pursuing their relationship in favor of Mandy. When Karen threatens Mandy through a phone call, Mandy vengefully runs over Karen with her car, which leaves Karen with possibly permanent deficiencies. Lip, upset over Karen's vegetative state, angrily breaks up with Mandy. To give Karen a better recovery, Jody and Sheila break up, and Jody leaves town with Karen and Hymie to Arizona.

The final episodes of the third season, while still comedic, begins to shift into a darker tone. Frank is diagnosed with liver failure and is advised to stop drinking or he will die. Fiona visits Frank in the hospital and tries to convince him to stop drinking for either himself or his kids, but he refuses. Depressed from Mickey's marriage, Ian enlists in the Army without the knowledge of his family, only revealing the news to a shocked Mickey. He leaves secretly the next morning, forging identification using Lip's ID. Meanwhile, Estefania is deported due to Jimmy's neglectfulness. Nando orders Jimmy to board a yacht to an unknown location, presumably for Jimmy to be murdered. Fiona begins a temp job at Worldwide Cup, and she sends a final voicemail to Jimmy's phone signalling that she is over him.

Cast and characters

Regular
 William H. Macy as Frank Gallagher
 Emmy Rossum as Fiona Gallagher
 Justin Chatwin as Steve Wilton / Jimmy Lishman
 Ethan Cutkosky as Carl Gallagher
 Shanola Hampton as Veronica "V" Fisher
 Steve Howey as Kevin "Kev" Ball
 Emma Kenney as Debbie Gallagher
 Cameron Monaghan as Ian Gallagher
 Jeremy Allen White as Philip "Lip" Gallagher
 Joan Cusack as Sheila Jackson (credited as "special guest star" in opening title sequence)
 Noel Fisher as Mickey Milkovich (episodes 2-12)
 Emma Greenwell as Mandy Milkovich
 Zach McGowan as Jody Silverman

Recurring
 Laura Slade Wiggins as Karen Jackson
 Stephanie Fantauzzi as Estefania
 Vanessa Bell Calloway as Carol Fisher
 Jake McDorman as Mike Pratt
 Harry Hamlin as Lloyd 'Ned' Lishman
 Bradley Whitford as Abraham Paige
 Christian Clemenson as Christopher Collier
 Isidora Goreshter as Svetlana
 Brent Sexton as Patrick Gallagher
 Michael Patrick McGill as Tommy
 Kerry O'Malley as Kate
 J. Michael Trautmann as Iggy Milkovich
 Jim Hoffmaster as Kermit
 Bernardo de Paula as Beto
 Pêpê Rapazote as Nando
 Maile Flanagan as Connie
 Dennis Cockrum as Terry Milkovich
 David Wells as Father Pete
 Ed Lauter as Dick Healey
 Eric Edelstein as Bobby Mallison
 Diora Baird as Meg
 Cameron Richardson as Cheryl
 Miguel Izaguirre as Paco
 Justine Lupe as Blake Collins

Episodes

Development and production
On February 1, 2012, Showtime announced the series would be renewed for a third season.
The show's third season began shooting on June 27, 2012<ref>"Okay, bedtime. First day of shooting for season 3 starts tomorrow!". Twitter.com. Retrieved 2012-06-27.</ref> and premiered on Sunday, January 13, 2013.

Casting
Noel Fisher, Emma Greenwell and Zach McGowan were promoted to series regulars for their roles as Mickey Milkovich, Mandy Milkovich and Jody Silverman respectively. Laura Slade Wiggins was demoted to a recurring character for her role as Karen Jackson, after her character left in the second season's finale. Wiggins' character returns mid-way through the third season, in the episode "A Long Way From Home". Stephanie Fantauzzi, Vanessa Bell Calloway, and Tyler Jacob Moore return as recurring characters for their roles as Estefania, Carol Fisher, and Tony Markovich.

Reception
Review aggregator Rotten Tomatoes gives the third season a 92%, based on 13 reviews. The critics consensus reads, "Shameless'' divvies up a spoil of riches among its impoverished ensemble, further fleshing out all members of the Gallagher clan in surprising ways."

DVD release

References

External links
 
 

2013 British television seasons
Shameless (American TV series)